William Jones (October 2, 1914 – May 25, 1999) was an American football player and coach. He served as the head football coach at Indiana State University in Terre Haute, Indiana from 1957 to 1965. A graduate of Ohio Wesleyan University, Jones was named the most valuable player by his teammate his senior year.

A successful prep coach, Jones accepted the Indiana State job in the fall of 1957; he's currently 4th in ISU annuals for coaching wins, possesses the only conference title in 110+ seasons of Indiana State Univ football history and was a 3-time "Coach of the Year" in the Indiana Collegiate Conference.

He held degrees from Ohio Wesleyan (B.A.) and Indiana State (M.A.); he won conferences titles at Indiana State as well as Sullivan High.

Head coaching record

College

References

1914 births
1999 deaths
American football fullbacks
Indiana State Sycamores football coaches
Ohio Wesleyan Battling Bishops football players
High school football coaches in Indiana
People from Clinton, Indiana
Players of American football from Indiana